Georgije Đokić (Serbian Cyrillic: Георгије Ђокић; born May 6, 1949) is a retired Serbian Orthodox bishop who served as the head of the Serbian Orthodox Eparchy of Canada from 1984 until May 20, 2015.

Biography
He was born on May 6 (Saint George's Day in the Serbian Orthodox Church) as Đorđe Đokić in the village of Crnjelovo Gornje near Bijeljina to father Hadži-Krsta and mother Krunija (née Arsenović) who gave their children to the church. The bishop's brother  is also a retired bishop having served as the Bishop of Central Europe from 1991 to 2013, his other brother Ljubomir is a priest in Vršani near Bijeljina, and his sister Nadežda is a nun in the Tavna monastery.

From 1967 to 1969, he was part of the first generation of students at a two-year monastic school in the Ostrog monastery at a time when the manager and professor was hieromonk Irinej (Gavrilović), who was later the Patriarch of the Serbian Orthodox Church from 2010 to 2020. Pupils of the same generation were also future bishops: Bishop of Britain and Scandinavia Dositej (Motika), Bishop of Šumadija Jovan (Mladenović) and Bishop of Valjevo Milutin. He served from 1971 to 1982 as a hieromonk and clergyman in the Tavna monastery. At that time, he graduated from the Theological Seminary of Sremski Karlovci, and the Faculty of Theology at the University of Belgrade.

As bishop
As a syncellus, he was appointed Bishop of Canada on May 16, 1984. Patriarch German consecrated him on July 8, 1984 in St. Michael's Cathedral in Belgrade with the cooperation of the Bishop of Timok Milutin (Stojadinović) and the Bishop of Zvornik and Tuzla Vasilije. He was enthroned in the Saint Nicholas Serbian Orthodox Cathedral in Hamilton on the day of the Intercession of the Theotokos on October 14, 1984. The enthronement was performed by the Bishop of East America and Canada Christopher who on that occasion officially handed over the Canadian diocese.

He was a member of the central body for the construction of the Church of Saint Sava in Belgrade.

Under his leadership, eleven new churches and chapels were consecrated as well as the first Serbian monastery, the Holy Transfiguration Monastery in Milton. He re-founded the Circle of Serbian Sisters, brought fifteen new priests to Canada, launched the diocesan magazine and diocesan publishing house Istočnik in 1987, and founded the Holy Transfiguration monastery library, among other things.

Bishop Georgije was the first bishop of the renewed Eparchy of Mileševa in the period from 1992 to 1994 (at that time he was only the administrator of the diocese of Canada). In the year when his thirtieth year as Bishop was commemorated, he was awarded the highest decoration of the Eparchy of Mileševa: the Order of the White Angel of the first degree. The decoration was presented by Bishop of Mileševa Filaret (Mićević) after a joint service in Mileševa on June 1, 2014.

After numerous complaints from the clergy and the faithful, the Holy Assembly of Bishops of the Serbian Orthodox Church temporarily dismissed Bishop Georgije from the throne of the Eparchy of Canada on April 28, 2015. The accusations concerned his moral life and alleged financial abuse with candles. The decision on dismissal was confirmed by the Holy Assembly of Bishops on May 20, 2015.

Published books
 Pečat mojega vladičanstva, 2006
 Kovčežić uspomena, 2011

References

1949 births
Living people
People from Bijeljina
Serbs of Bosnia and Herzegovina
20th-century Eastern Orthodox bishops
21st-century Eastern Orthodox bishops
Bishops of the Serbian Orthodox Church
Serbian Orthodox Church in Canada
Eastern Orthodox bishops in Canada
Canadian people of Serbian descent
Yugoslav emigrants to Canada